LookLeft is a bi-monthly political magazine produced by the Workers' Party.

History and profile
Founded in 2006 (Issue 1 September–October 2006) and relaunched in a more broad-left format in March 2010, LookLeft covers a range of broad-left views. According to its website, LookLeft provides a non-sectarian platform for progressive news, views and debate from working class communities as well as from a wide range of left-wing activists. The Look Left Forum was proposed as an effort to engage the different strands of left-wing politics, particularly in Northern Ireland, with a view to co-operating and running non-sectarian left-wing candidates in elections.

Editors
LookLeft is produced by an editorial committee and is assisted by a number of journalists on a voluntary basis.

Contributors
Among the contributors to Look Left, are Keith Lamb, Roisin Ni Dhalaigh, Tara Brady, David Lynch, Fergus Whelan, Dara McHugh and former Dublin City Councillor for the Workers Party Eilis Ryan.

References

External links
 LookLeft.ie

Bi-monthly magazines
Magazines established in 2006
Mass media in Dublin (city)
News magazines published in Europe
Political magazines published in Ireland
Workers' Party (Ireland)